Diet Pepsi Jazz was an American brand of soda introduced by the Pepsi company in 2006 and discontinued in 2009. It was a specifically named variant of Pepsi's popular Diet Pepsi product, combining several different flavors.

History
In 2006, the Pepsi Corporation launched Pepsi Jazz, a flanker of their Diet Pepsi product, after considering the names "Splurge" and "Indulge." The drink came in three zero-calorie, dessert-themed flavors: Jazz with Black Cherry and French Vanilla, Jazz with Strawberries and Cream, and Caramel Cream. It used the 2003 Pepsi logo. 

The company launched the soda with a substantial advertising campaign, using the tagline "Jazz, the new sound of cola." The campaign included a jazz- and blues-themed television spot by DDB, with actress Leah Elias and a soundtrack by Groove Collective's Genji Siraisi, as well as a four-page advertising spread in People Magazine with a three-dimensional pop-up image of the bottle, an audio clip of the soundtrack played via embedded chip, and a scratch and sniff area diffusing the drink's scent. The company had also envisioned an interactive website as part of the campaign that would allow viewers to remix Siraisi's soundtrack, but it was never developed. Ethnomusicologist Mark Laver argues that the campaign was intended to target a young and specifically African American clientele.

The campaign was noted for its similarities with rival Coca-Cola's own contemporaneous jazz branding. Around the same time, Coca-Cola had donated $10 million to Jazz at Lincoln Center (J@LC) for construction of a new building and education programs in a new performance space, then called Dizzy’s Club Coca-Cola. Pepsi brand manager Lauren Scott claimed that the two campaigns were unrelated.

PepsiCo discontinued Pepsi Jazz in 2007 after poor sales and the greater success of another flanker, Pepsi Max.

In popular culture
Pepsi Jazz is mentioned in the motion picture The Promotion as John C. Reilly is setting up a soda display.

Ingredients
Black Cherry and French Vanilla
 Carbonated water
 Caramel color
 Natural and artificial flavors
 Phosphoric acid
 Aspartame
 Potassium benzoate (preserves freshness)
 Citric acid
 Potassium citrate
 Caffeine
 Acesulfame potassium
 Calcium disodium EDTA (to protect flavor)

See also
 List of defunct consumer brands
 List of Pepsi types

References

PepsiCo soft drinks
Products introduced in 2006
Products and services discontinued in 2009
Diet drinks
Discontinued soft drinks